The 2024 UEFA European Football Championship, commonly referred to as UEFA Euro 2024 (stylised as UEFA EURO 2024) or simply Euro 2024, will be the 17th edition of the UEFA European Championship, the quadrennial international men's football championship of Europe organised by UEFA. Germany will host the tournament, which is scheduled to take place from 14 June to 14 July 2024.
It will be the third time that European Championship matches are played on German territory and the second time in reunified Germany as the former West Germany hosted the tournament of 1988, and four matches of the multi-national Euro 2020 were played in Munich. It will be the first time the competition is held in the region of former East Germany with Leipzig as a host city, as well as the first time that a reunified Germany served as a solo host nation. The tournament will return to its usual 4-year cycle, after Euro 2020 was delayed to 2021 due to the COVID-19 pandemic.

Italy are the defending champions having won the 2020 tournament.

Bid process

On March 8, 2017, UEFA announced that only two countries, Germany and Turkey, had announced their intentions to host the tournament before the deadline of 3 March 2017.

The host was selected on 27 September 2018 in Nyon, Switzerland. Germany initially planned to fully host Euro 2020 although never announced any firm interest by May 2012.

The UEFA Executive Committee voted for the host in a secret ballot, with only a simple majority required to determine the host. In the event of a tie, the UEFA President would cast the decisive vote. Of the 20 members of the Executive Committee, two were ineligible to vote and one was absent, leaving a total of seventeen voting members.

Qualification

As hosts, Germany qualified for the tournament automatically. The 23 remaining spots will be determined by a qualifying tournament; 20 spots will be decided by the direct qualification of the winners and runners-up of the 10 qualifying groups, with the remaining three spots decided by play-offs. Places in the play-offs will be given to the teams that perform the best in the 2022–23 UEFA Nations League who have not already qualified via the main qualifying tournament.

At a meeting of the UEFA Executive Committee in Hvar, Croatia, on 20 September 2022, it was confirmed that Russia would be excluded from qualifying for Euro 2024, all Russian teams having been suspended by UEFA following the country's invasion of Ukraine in February 2022. This meant Russia would not appear at the European Championship finals for the first time since 2000.

The draw for the UEFA Euro 2024 qualifying group stage was held on 9 October 2022 at the Festhalle in Frankfurt. The qualifying group stage will take place from March to November 2023, while the three play-offs will be held in March 2024.

Qualified teams

Venues
Germany had a wide choice of stadia that satisfied UEFA's minimum capacity requirement of 30,000 seats for European Championship matches.

Of the ten venues selected for Euro 2024, nine were used for the 2006 FIFA World Cup: Berlin, Dortmund, Munich, Cologne, Stuttgart, Hamburg, Leipzig, Frankfurt, and Gelsenkirchen. Düsseldorf, which was not used in 2006 but had previously been used for the 1974 FIFA World Cup and UEFA Euro 1988, will serve as the tenth venue; conversely, Hanover, Nuremberg and Kaiserslautern, host cities in 2006, will not be used for this championship.

Various other stadiums, such as those in Bremen and Mönchengladbach were not selected. The venues covered all the main regions of Germany, but the area with the highest number of venues at UEFA Euro 2024 is the Rhine-Ruhr metropolitan region in the state of North Rhine-Westphalia, with four of the ten host cities (Dortmund, Düsseldorf, Gelsenkirchen and Cologne).

Draw
The final tournament draw will take place in December 2023 at the Elbphilharmonie in Hamburg. The teams will be seeded in accordance with the overall European Qualifiers rankings. Hosts Germany will be automatically seeded into pot 1, and placed in position A1. The three play-off winners will not be known at the time of the draw, and the teams participating in those play-offs, scheduled to be held in March 2024, will be placed into pot 4 for the draw.

Group stage
UEFA announced the tournament schedule on 10 May 2022, which only included kick-off times for the opening match, semi-finals and final.

Group winners, runners-up and the best four third-placed teams will advance to the round of 16.

All times are local, CEST (UTC+2).

Tiebreakers
If two or more teams are equal on points on completion of the group matches, the following tie-breaking criteria are applied:
 Higher number of points obtained in the matches played between the teams in question;
 Superior goal difference resulting from the matches played between the teams in question;
 Higher number of goals scored in the matches played between the teams in question;
 If, after having applied criteria 1 to 3, teams still have an equal ranking, criteria 1 to 3 are reapplied exclusively to the matches between the teams who are still level to determine their final rankings. If this procedure does not lead to a decision, criteria 5 to 10 applied;
 Superior goal difference in all group matches;
 Higher number of goals scored in all group matches;
 If on the last round of the group stage, two teams are facing each other and each had the same number of points, as well as the same number of goals scored and conceded, and the score finished level in their match, their ranking is determined by a penalty shoot-out. (This criterion is not used if more than two teams had the same number of points.);
 Lower disciplinary points total in all group matches (1 point for a single yellow card, 3 points for a red card as a consequence of two yellow cards, 3 points for a direct red card, 4 points for a yellow card followed by a direct red card);
 Higher position in the European Qualifiers overall ranking, unless the comparison involves hosts Germany, in which case a drawing of lots will take place.
Notes

Group A

Group B

Group C

Group D

Group E

Group F

Ranking of third-placed teams

Knockout phase
In the knockout phase, if a match is level at the end of normal playing time, extra time is played (two periods of 15 minutes each). If still tied after extra time, the match is decided by a penalty shoot-out.

As with every tournament since UEFA Euro 1984, there is no third place play-off.

The specific match-ups involving the third-placed teams depended on which four third-placed teams qualify for the round of 16:

All times are local, CEST (UTC+2).

Bracket

Round of 16

Quarter-finals

Semi-finals

Final

Marketing

Logo and slogan
The official logo was unveiled on 5 October 2021, during a ceremony at the Olympiastadion in Berlin. The logo depicts the Henri Delaunay Trophy with 24 coloured slices around the trophy representing the 24 participating nations, and the ellipse reflects the shape of the Olympiastadion. In addition, each of the ten host cities has their own unique logo, featuring the following local sights:

 Berlin: Brandenburg Gate
 Cologne: Cologne Cathedral
 Dortmund: Dortmund U-Tower
 Düsseldorf: Schlossturm, Rheinkniebrücke, Rheinturm
 Frankfurt: Römer
 Gelsenkirchen: Musiktheater im Revier
 Hamburg: Elbphilharmonie
 Leipzig: Monument to the Battle of the Nations
 Munich: Frauenkirche
 Stuttgart: Fernsehturm Stuttgart

The official slogan of the tournament is "United by Football. ." The slogan was chosen to promote diversity and inclusion.

Broadcasters

The International Broadcast Centre (IBC) will be located at the halls of the Leipzig Trade Fair in Leipzig, Germany.

References

External links

 
2024
2023–24 in UEFA football
2023–24 in German football
2024
June 2024 sports events in Germany
July 2024 sports events in Germany
Scheduled association football competitions